Archduchess Maria Anna Isabelle Epiphanie Eugenie Gabriele of Austria, full German name: Maria Anna Isabelle Epiphanie Eugenie Gabriele, Erzherzogin von Österreich (6 January 1882, Linz, Upper Austria, Austria-Hungary – 25 February 1940, Lausanne, Vaud, Switzerland) was a member of the Teschen branch of the House of Habsburg-Lorraine and an Archduchess of Austria and Princess of Bohemia, Hungary, and Tuscany by birth. Through her marriage to Prince Elias of Bourbon-Parma (later Duke of Parma), Maria Anna  was also a member of the House of Bourbon-Parma and a Princess of Bourbon-Parma.

Early life
Maria Anna was the second child and daughter of Archduke Friedrich, Duke of Teschen and his wife Princess Isabella of Croÿ.

Marriage and issue
Maria Anna married Prince Elias of Bourbon-Parma, the eldest son of Robert I, Duke of Parma, and his first wife, Princess Maria Pia of Bourbon-Two Sicilies, on 25 May 1903 in Vienna.

Elias gave Maria Anne an engagement ring with a oval ruby surrounded by diamonds. Following her marriage, Maria Anna amassed a significant collection of jewellery, both as wedding gifts and through later gifts and inheritances. She produced an inventory of these jewels in 1932. The collection was auctioned by Sotheby's in November 2018.

Maria Anna and Elias had eight children:

Princess Elisabetta (17 March 1904 – 13 June 1983); she died unmarried.
Prince Carlo (22 September 1905 – 26 September 1912); he died of poliomyelitis.
Princess Maria Francesca (5 September 1906 – 1994); she died unmarried.
Robert Hugo, Duke of Parma (7 August 1909 – 25 November 1974); he died unmarried.
Prince Francesco (14 June 1913 – 29 May 1959); he died unmarried.
Princess Giovanna (8 July 1916 – 1 November 1949); she never married and was killed in a shooting accident in La Toledana, Spain.
Princess Alicia (13 November 1917 – 28 March 2017); she married Infante Alfonso, Duke of Calabria.
Princess Maria Cristina (7 June 1925 – 1 September 2009); she died unmarried.

Ancestry

References

1882 births
1940 deaths
People from Linz
House of Habsburg-Lorraine
Austrian princesses
Princesses of Bourbon-Parma